Nearer My God to Thee is a bluegrass gospel album by American country music duo The Louvin Brothers, released in 1957.

It was the duo's first Gospel album for Capitol after the release of several Gospel singles from 1952-1955. All those single releases would later be collected on one album, The Family Who Prays.

Reissues 
 In 1992, all of the tracks from Nearer My God to Thee were included in the Close Harmony 8-CD box set issued by Bear Family Records.
 In 2002, Nearer My God to Thee was reissued by King Records.
 In 2007, Nearer My God to Thee was reissued by Capitol Nashville Records.

Track listing 
 "Are You Washed in the Blood?" (Mark Johnson, Traditional) – 2:25
 "Nearer, My God, to Thee" (Lowell Mason, Traditional) – 2:49
 "Wait a Little Longer, Please Jesus" (Hazel Houser, Smith) – 2:48
 "I Can't Say No" (Ira Louvin, Charlie Louvin) – 2:37
 "I Won't Have to Cross Jordan Alone" (C. E. Dunham, T. Ramsey) – 2:26
 "There's No Excuse" (Louvin, Louvin) – 3:02
 "This Little Light of Mine" (Traditional) – 2:32
 "Praying" (Hazel Houser) – 2:43
 "Thankful" (Louvin, Louvin) – 2:57
 "Lord, I'm Coming Home" (Traditional) – 3:15
 "Last Chance to Pray" (Louvin, Louvin) – 2:42
 "I Steal Away and Pray" (Louvin, Louvin) – 2:28

Personnel 
 Charlie Louvin – vocals, guitar
 Ira Louvin – vocals, mandolin

References 

1957 albums
The Louvin Brothers albums
Capitol Records albums
Gospel albums by American artists
Albums produced by Ken Nelson (United States record producer)